The 2019 Sanfrecce Hiroshima season involves the team competing in the J1 League, they finished runners-up in the 2018 J1 League. They will also compete in the J.League Cup, Emperor's Cup, and AFC Champions League.

Squad

Competitions

J1 League

League table

Results

J. League Cup

Quarterfinals

Emperor's Cup

AFC Champions League

Group standings

Results

References 

Sanfrecce Hiroshima
Sanfrecce Hiroshima seasons